Friction is the force that opposes the relative motion or tendency of such motion of two surfaces in contact.

Friction may also refer to:

Music 
 Friction (Coney Hatch album), 1983 album by Coney Hatch
 Friction (Stavesacre album), 1996 album by Stavesacre
 Friction (Phideaux Xavier album), 1993 album by Phideaux Xavier
 Friction (band), a Japanese rock band formed in 1978
 Friction (English musician), a drum and bass artist from the UK
 Friction (Ghanaian musician), an Afrobeat and reggae artist from Ghana
 DJ Friction (Germany), a German hip-hop DJ and producer
 "Friction," a song by Television from their 1977 album Marquee Moon
 "Friction," a song by Morcheeba from their 1998 album Big Calm
 “Friction,” a song by B'z from their 2007 album Action
 "Friction," a song by Imagine Dragons from their 2015 album Smoke + Mirrors

Other uses
 Friction: An Ethnography of Global Connection, a 2004 book by anthropologist Anna Tsing
 Friction, a show on BBC Asian Network hosted by Bobby Friction
 Friction, a type of market incompleteness
 Friction, a concept introduced by Carl von Clausewitz to name how simple things become difficult in war because of misfortunes and mistakes
 Friction, the codename of Charlotte Beck, a character in the Marvel Comics publication DP 7

See also
 DJ Friction (disambiguation)
 
 Phriction